The 1945 Idaho Vandals football team represented the University of Idaho in the 1945 college football season. The Vandals were led by first-year head coach James A. Brown and were members of the Pacific Coast Conference. Home games were played on campus at Neale Stadium in Moscow, with none held in Boise this season.

Idaho was  overall and won one of their six PCC games. The football program returned after missing the previous two seasons, due to World War II manpower shortages.  Composed mostly of freshmen, Idaho met two nearby teams twice, Washington State and the Farragut Naval Training Station, their sole non-conference opponent. The Vandals did not venture outside of the Northwest; the longest road trip was to play Oregon in Eugene.

Idaho tied the Cougars five years later, but the winless streak continued 

In the rivalry game with Montana, Idaho won  in Moscow to retain the Little Brown Stein; it was the third of six straight shutouts in the series, with each side winning three.

At Farragut on November 10,  of snow was removed from the field just prior to the game by 

Alumnus Brown ran the downsized UI athletic department during the war and coached the basketball team for four seasons  Due to the death of Francis Schmidt in September 1944, Brown was the interim football coach in 1945; he was named head coach in March 1946, but resigned eight months

Schedule

All-conference
No Vandals were named to the All-Coast team; halfback Jim Hatch was honorable mention.

References

External links
Gem of the Mountains: 1946 University of Idaho yearbook – 1945 football season
Go Mighty Vandals – 1945 football season
Official game program: Idaho at Washington State –  October 27, 1945
WSU Libraries: Game video – Idaho at Washington State – October 27, 1945
Idaho Argonaut – student newspaper – 1945 editions

Idaho
Idaho Vandals football seasons
Idaho Vandals football